Gouderak is a village in the Dutch province of South Holland. It is located 4 km southwest of Gouda on the river Hollandsche IJssel, in the municipality of Krimpenerwaard.

References

External links

Populated places in South Holland
Former municipalities of South Holland
Krimpenerwaard